Eileen April Boylan (born May 10, 1987) is an American film and television actress. She stands  and is of Filipino and Irish descent.

Biography 
Boylan was born in Acton, California, the daughter of Merlie Baris and Frank Boylan. She has one brother Tommy Boylan, and multiple half-siblings including David Boylan.

Film
Boylan made her film debut playing a younger version of the title character in the 2001 film Alex in Wonder (a.k.a. Sex and a Girl). In 2004, she starred opposite Alexa Vega and Sara Paxton in the film Sleepover. She starred in her first leading role playing the title character in the 2008 independent film Dakota Skye. In 2011, Boylan starred opposite Tom Selleck as a central character in the television movie Jesse Stone: Innocents Lost.

Television
Boylan's television credits include roles on Baywatch, General Hospital, Judging Amy and a recurring role on the Lifetime original series Strong Medicine. In 2006, she joined the ensemble cast of The N original series South of Nowhere, portraying Kyla Woods throughout the second and third seasons. Boylan made appearances in various TV serials from 2008 through 2009, including a role in the Life episode "Everything...All The Time", and as a college girl named Melissa in the How I Met Your Mother episode "Three Days of Snow". She had a recurring role on the ABC Family TV series Greek as the ditsy and often drunk sorority girl Betsy, from 2008 until the series’ cancellation in 2011.

Filmography

Television

References

External links

Profile at The-N-Com 

1987 births
20th-century American actresses
21st-century American actresses
Actresses from California
American child actresses
American film actresses
American actresses of Filipino descent
American television actresses
Living people
People from Acton, California